Ulrum is a village in the Dutch province of Groningen. It is located in the municipality of Het Hogeland.

History
The first time the town was named was as Uluringhem in the 11th century.

Ulrum is sited on two mounds. On the western one stands the Romano-Gothic church of Ulrum (built at the end of the 12th century), on the eastern mound stood the Asingaborg. 

Ulrum was once a thriving village with many tradesmen and small businesses. Now only agricultural activity remains.

Ulrum was a separate municipality until 1990, when it merged with Eenrum, Kloosterburen, and Leens. The new municipality was called Ulrum at first, but was renamed to De Marne in 1992.

Gallery

References

External links
 

Het Hogeland
Populated places in Groningen (province)
Former municipalities of Groningen (province)